Corra Mae Harris (March 17, 1869 – February 7, 1935), was an American writer and journalist. She was one of the first women war correspondents to go abroad in World War I.

Biography
Corra Mae White was born in Elbert County, Georgia, March 17, 1869. Her formal education was limited to teacher training at nearby female academies, though she never graduated from any of the schools she attended.

In 1887 she married Methodist minister and educator Lundy Howard Harris (1858–1910). They had one child survive to adulthood, a daughter named Faith (1887–1919). For roughly two decades Harris struggled through various personal tragedies, including a troubled marriage; the death of two infant sons; scandal and humiliation surrounding the abandonment, betrayal, and return of her husband in 1898 and his public confessions of adultery; the financial destitution resulting from the loss of his teaching position at Emory College; his suicide in 1910; her daughter's death in 1919; and her sister's death shortly after that. Harris remained a widow until her death 25 years later.

Harris was, for a time, the most widely known woman from the state of Georgia. Her literary reputation during her life and legacy since are connected with A Circuit Rider's Wife published in 1910. Reputedly autobiographical, the novel is at most a spiritual autobiography, with little else that resembles her actual life. She wrote more than two dozen books, nineteen of which were published. Two were autobiographies, one a travel journal, and two became feature-length movies, the best known was I'd Climb the Highest Mountain, released in 1951 and inspired by, A Circuit Rider's Wife. The other was the 1920 film Husbands and Wives.  She published over 200 articles and short stories, and well over a thousand book reviews. She was one of the first women war correspondents to go abroad in World War I. She lived the last two decades of her life at the place she named In the Valley in Bartow County, Georgia. She wrote lovingly of "The Valley" where she lived as early as 1914.

Although she became famous for her fiction, Harris's reputation for reactionary conservatism lasted throughout her life and became part of her contradictory legacy. Such a reputation resulted in part from her first nationally published piece in 1899. After the lynching of Thomas Wilkes, alias Sam Hose, near Newnan, Georgia, William Hayes Ward, editor-in-chief at the Independent, published an editorial denouncing the act. Harris wrote and the Independent published "A Southern Woman's View," a reply upholding the southern practice of lynching with reasoning anti-lynching activist Ida B. Wells-Barnett (Ida B. Wells) called "threadbare", namely to protect innocent white women from malevolent black men. Editors at the Independent asked Harris for more, which launched her writing career. Afterward, she wrote several non-fiction essays on southern identity that furthered conventional images of southerners during the first decade of the century. They also tied her reputation then and after to regional apologia (apologists), an image that belies the complexity of her body of work.

After A Circuit Rider's Wife was published in 1910, Harris wrote and published prolifically, both fiction and non-fiction, throughout the nineteen-teens.  During the 1920s, her most successful works were two autobiographies published in the middle of the decade.  By the early 1930s Harris's publishing was limited largely to local areas. The last four years of her life, from 1931–1935, she published what critics have called some of her best writing in a tri-weekly "Candlelit Column" in the Atlanta Journal. Some critics have dismissed Harris's fiction as domestic or sentimental, but others find nuanced social and cultural critique in her works, especially of the South's gender and racial mores.

Harris died in Atlanta, February 7, 1935.

Works
 (1904). The Jessica Letters, in collaboration with Paul Elmer More.
 (1910). A Circuit Rider's Wife.
 (1910). Eve's Second Husband.
 (1912). The Recording Angel.
 (1913). In Search of a Husband.
 (1915). The Co-Citizens.
 (1915). Justice.
 (1916). A Circuit Rider's Widow.
 (1918). Making Her His Wife.
 (1919). From Sunup to Sundown.
 (1919). In Search of a Husband.
 (1920). Happily Married.
 (1921). My Son.
 (1922). The Eyes of Love.
 (1923). A Daughter of Adam.
 (1923). The House of Helen.
 (1924). My Book and My Heart.
 (1925). As a Woman Thinks.
 (1926). Flapper Anne.
 (1927). The Happy Pilgrimage.

Selected articles
 (1914). "New York as Seen from a Georgia Valley: In the Valley," The Independent 77, pp. 97–99.
 (1914). "The Abomination of Cities," The Independent 77, pp. 129–131.
 (1914). "Men and Women: And the 'Woman Question'," The Independent 77, pp. 164–165.
 (1914). "Marriage: New Profession or Old Miracle?," The Independent 77, pp. 234–235.
 (1914). "The Streets of the City," The Independent 77, pp. 306–308.
 (1914). "How New York Amuses Itself," The Independent 77, pp. 374–376.
 (1914). "The Literary Spectrum of New York," The Independent 77, pp. 441–443.
 (1914). "If You Must Come to New York," The Independent 78, pp. 29–32.
 (1914). "The Valley: After New York," The Independent 79, pp. 63–65.
 (1915). "From the Peace Zone in the Valley," The Independent 81, pp. 190–192.
 (1915). "War and Bride in June," The Independent 81, p. 506.
 (1916). "Why We Should Read Books," The Independent 85, pp. 117–118.
 (1916). "What Men Know About Women," The Independent 85, p. 379.
 (1916). "June Brides," The Independent 85, p. 377.
 (1916). "The Woman of Yesterday," The Independent 85, pp. 484.
 (1916). "In the Valley," The Independent 87, pp. 123–124.
 (1916). "Politics and Prayers in the Valley," The Independent 87, pp. 135–136.
 (1917). "War Time in the Valley," The Independent 91, p. 471.
 (1919). "Was Eve a Feminist?," The Independent 97, p. 338.

Short stories
 (1912). "Jeff," The Independent 73, pp. 714–724.
 (1913). "On the Instalment Plan," Harper's Monthly Magazine, Vol. CXXVII, pp. 342–353.
 (1915). "The Other People," Harper's Monthly Magazine, Vol. CXXVII, pp. 54–57.

See also
Corra White Harris House, Study, and Chapel, her home "In the Valley", which is listed on the National Register of Historic Places

References

 Oglesby, Catherine (2007). "Corra Harris," in Ruppersburg, Hugh & Inscoe, John C. (Eds), The New Georgia Encyclopedia Companion To Georgia Literature. Athens: University of Georgia Press, pp. 201–203.  Online version: .
 Oglesby, Catherine (2008). Corra Harris and the Divided Mind of the New South. Gainesville:  University Press of Florida.
 Talmadge, John E. (1968). Corra Harris:  Lady of Purpose. Athens:  University of Georgia Press.

Further reading
 Blackstock, Walter (1955). "Corra Harris: An Analytical Study of Her Novels," Florida State University Studies 19, pp. 39–92.
 Coffing, Karen (1995). "Corra Harris and the Saturday Evening Post: Southern Domesticity Conveyed to a National Audience, 1900-1930," Georgia Historical Quarterly 79, pp. 367–93.
 Edwards, C. H. (1963). "The Early Literary Criticism of Corra Harris," The Georgia Review, Vol. 17, No. 4, pp. 449–455.
 Mathews, Donald (2009). "Corra Harris: The Storyteller as Folk Preacher," in Georgia Women: Their Lives and Times, Vol. 1, ed. Ann Short Chirhart and Betty Wood. Athens: University of Georgia Press.
 Mixon, Wayne (1988). "Traditionalist and Iconoclast: Corra Harris and Southern Writing 1900-1920," in Developing Dixie: Modernization in a Traditional Society, ed. Winfred B. Moore Jr., et al. Westport, Conn.: Greenwood Press.
 Overton, Grant M. (1922). "Corra Harris," in The Women who Make our Novels. New York: Moffat, Yard & Company.
 Reeves, Ruby (1937). Corra Harris: Her Life and Works (master's thesis, University of Georgia).
 Simms, Jr., L. Moody (1979). “Corra Harris on the Decline of Southern Writing,” Southern Studies 18, pp. 247–50
 Tate, William (1951). "A Neighbor's Recollections of Corra Harris," The Georgia Review, Vol. 5, No. 1, pp. 22–33.
 Williams, E. Virginia (1930). Religion and the Church as Motifs in American Fiction (master's thesis, Vanderbilt University).

External links 

 
 
 Corra Harris (1869-1935)
 Corra May Harris (1869-1935): "Professor of Evil"
 Harris, Corra Mae White
 Censoring Art and History
 Corra Harris historical marker
 In the Valley Collection (Corra Harris Historic Homestead, Bartow County, Georgia), 1902–2004, from the Kennesaw State University Archives.
 Stuart A. Rose Manuscript, Archives, and Rare Book Library

20th-century American novelists
American women novelists
1869 births
1935 deaths
Novelists from Georgia (U.S. state)
American women journalists
20th-century American women writers
Journalists from Georgia (U.S. state)
People from Elbert County, Georgia
20th-century American non-fiction writers